Schools in Thailand provide basic education, which covers pre-primary, primary and secondary education. Though most schools provide formal education following the National Curriculum, certain specialised schools may provide non-formal education. Most state schools operate under the auspices of the Office of the Basic Education Commission (OBEC), local governments, or universities, while private schools operate under the oversight of the Office of the Private Education Commission.

There are 37,175 schools in Thailand providing general education as of the 2011 academic year. These include 31,286 schools under the OBEC, 1,726 operated by local governments, 57 university demonstration schools, 414 Phrapariyatidhamma (Buddhist) schools and 3,679 private schools. This list covers notable schools providing general education in the primary and secondary levels, listed by province.

Amnat Charoen
Amnatcharoen School
Pukdeecharoen huana khokchangmanai School

Bangkok

Buriram
Buriram Pittayakhom School
Lamplaimat Pattana School
Marie Anusorn School
Nondindaeng Municipality School
Lahansai Ratchadapisek School
Watbansalangkong School

Chachoengsao
Benchamaratrungsarit 2 School
Dat Darunee School

Chiang Mai
American Pacific International School
Chiang Mai International School
Dara Academy
Fangchanupathum School
Grace International School
Lanna International School
Montfort College
Nakorn Payap International School
Panyaden International School
Prem Tinsulanonda International School
Prince Royal's College
Marmara Schools Wichai Wittaya English Program
Wattanothai Payap Highschool
Chumchon Banbuakkroknoi school
lebron james
Education Gateway School

Chiang Rai
PSEP Bilingual School Chiang Rai
Chiang Rai International School
Chiang Rai Witthayakhom School
Samakkhi Witthayakhom School
Aekthaweewit School
Tessaban 1 bankao School
*[[Doilan Pittaya School]]

Chonburi
Assumption College Sriracha
Chonkanyanukoon School
Pattaya city 6 school

Kanchanaburi
Visuttharangsi School

Khon Kaen
Khon Kaen Wittayayon School

Krabi
Ammartpanichnukul School
Chokchai School
Krabi International School
Global Village International School

Lampang
Bunyawat Witthayalai School

Lamphun
Chakkam Khanathon School
Rapeeleart Wittaya School

Maha Sarakham
Sarakhampittayakhom School

Nakhon Nayok
Armed Forces Academies Preparatory School

Nakhon Pathom
Mahidol University International Demonstration School
Mahidol Wittayanusorn School

Nakhon Si Thammarat
Kanlayanee Si Thammarat School
Srithammarat Suksa School

Nakhon Ratchasima
Suranaree School
 St. Stephen's International School, Khao Yai
 http://www.nppdg.ac.th/
Klangdong Poonna Vitthaya School
Nhongphaipadungkitwittaya, Pakthongchai

Nan
 Chiangklang Prachapattana School
 Bandonkaew School
 Strisrinan School
 Pua School
 Srisawat wittayakarn School

Narathiwat
Darawithaya School

Nonthaburi
International School Bangkok
Watpracharangsan School
Suankularb Wittayalai Nonthaburi School

Phang Nga
Hanseatic School for Life

Phitsanulok
 Phitsanulok Pittayakom School
 Chalermkwansatri School
 Janokrong School
 Buddhachinnaraj Pittaya School 
 Princess Chulabhorn Science High School
 Teeratada Phitsanulok School
 Triamudomsuksa School of the north
 Nakhon Thai School
 Bang Krathum Pittayakom School
 Bangrakam Wittayasuksa School
 Noenmaprang Suksawittaya School
 Wangthong Pittayakom School
 Chattrakarn Wittaya School
 Watbot Suksa School
 Phromphiram Wittaya School 
 New Cambridge International School
Padoongrasdra School
Saint Nicholas School

Phichit
 Phichit Pitthayakom School
 Bangmulnakphoomi Wittayakom School 
 Samngamchanupatam School
 Kamphaeng Din Pittayakom School
 Khaosai Thapklo Phittaya School
 Taphanhin School
 Saklek Wittaya School
 Wangsaipoon Wittaya School
 Wachirabaramee Pittayakom School
 Dongcharoen Pittaya School
 Tessabanbanthaluang School
 Nernporangnok Chanuthit School

Phra Nakhon Si Ayutthaya
Ayutthaya Wittayalai School
Laboratory School of Phranakhon Si Ayutthaya Rajabhat University

Phuket
British International School, Phuket
International School of Phuket, ISP
Muang Thalang School
QSI International School of Phuket
Satree Phuket School
UWC Thailand
Indigo Kids International Preschool
Kajonkietsuksa School
Kajonkiet Pattana School
Kajonkiet Khokkloy School
Kajonkiet Thalang School
Kajonkiet International School
Kajonkiet Cherngtalay School
Baan Kajonkiet Nursery Paklok
Baan Kajonkiet Nursery Pasak
Baan Kajonkiet Nursery Saiyuan
Baan Kajonkiet Nursery Chaofa
Phuketwittayalai School
Kathuwitaya School
Muang Phuket Minicipal School
Prookpanya Minicipal School
Galileo Maritime Academy

Ratchaburi
Anuban Ratchaburi School
Benjamarachutit Ratchaburi School
Photha Wattana Senee School
Sarasit Phithayalai School

Rayong
Rayong English Programme School
St. Andrews International School, Green Valley

Samut Prakan
American School of Bangkok
Assumption Samutprakarn School
Concordian International School
Sriwittayapaknam School
Samutprakan School
Streesmutprakan School
Thai-Chinese International School
Thai Sikh International School
Bangpleeratbamrung School
Santidarun School
Praneelwatchara School

Saraburi
Adventist International Mission School

Songkhla Province
Hatyaiwittayalai School
Thamasakool School For The Blind
American Prep International School

Surat Thani
Oonrak School, Koh Samui
PanyaDee, The British International School of Samui
Si Ri Panya International School
Surat Thani International School
The International School of Samui

Tak
Sapphawitthayakhom School
Danmaelamaowitthayakhom School

Uttaradit
Uttaradit School

Uthaithani
Uthaiwitthayakhom School
Banraiwitthaya School
Nongchangwittaya School
Nongchangwittaya School
Karungwittayakhom School
Nongtaowitaya School
HuaiKhot Pittayakhom School

Buengkan
Buengkan School
Nasawanpitthayakhom School

Kalasin
Dongnoisongkror School

See also

Education in Thailand
List of demonstration schools in Thailand
List of international schools in Thailand
List of libraries in Thailand
List of universities and colleges in Thailand

Notes

References

External links

Thai Schools directory
Top 5 Phuket International Schools